When the Levees Broke: A Requiem in Four Acts is a 2006 documentary film directed by Spike Lee about the devastation of New Orleans, Louisiana following the failure of the levees during Hurricane Katrina.  It was filmed in late August and early September 2005, and premiered at the New Orleans Arena on August 16, 2006 and was first aired on HBO the following week. The television premiere aired in two parts on August 21 and 22, 2006 on HBO. It has been described by Sheila Nevins, chief of HBO's documentary unit, as "one of the most important films HBO has ever made."  The title is a reference to the blues tune "When the Levee Breaks" by Kansas Joe McCoy and Memphis Minnie about the Great Mississippi Flood of 1927.

The documentary was screened at the 63rd Venice International Film Festival on August 31 and September 1, 2006. It won the Orizzonti Documentary Prize and one of two FIPRESCI awards. It was also shown at the 2006 Toronto International Film Festival on September 15 and September 16, 2006. It won three awards at the 59th Primetime Emmy Awards and received a Peabody Award.

The documentary is based on news video footage and still photos of Katrina and its aftermath, interspersed with interviews. Interviewees include politicians, journalists, historians, engineers, and many residents of various parts of New Orleans and the surrounding areas, who give first hand accounts of their experiences with the levee failures and the aftermath.

In the style of Michael Apted's Up series (a documentary series that interviews Apted's subjects every seven years), Lee planned to interview his featured subjects in Levees at least once more.  In August 2010, HBO aired Lee's documentary series, If God Is Willing and Da Creek Don't Rise, which chronicles how New Orleans and the Gulf Coast area have fared in the five years following Hurricane Katrina.

Synopsis
The film focuses on the changed lives of New Orleans residents after Hurricane Katrina hit. The film shows residents in the midst of disaster dealing with death, devastation and disease. Spike Lee said about the film:

New Orleans is fighting for its life. These are not people who will disappear quietly — they're accustomed to hardship and slights, and they'll fight for New Orleans. This film will showcase the struggle for New Orleans by focusing on the profound loss, as well as the indomitable spirit of New Orleaneans.

This documentary is Spike Lee's third, preceded by 4 Little Girls (1997), about the Birmingham church bombing of 1963; and Jim Brown: All-American (2002), about the football player.

Shooting for the film began three months after Hurricane Katrina hit, when Lee and his camera crew took the first of eight trips to New Orleans. They conducted interviews and taped footage for the film. Lee hoped to hear varying opinions of the storm and responses to the storm's destruction. He interviewed nearly 100 people of diverse backgrounds and opinions for his film.

Interviewees
People appearing in interviews include:

 Glen David Andrews, musician
 John M. Barry, author and member of Southeast Louisiana Flood Protection Authority
 Harry Belafonte, actor and singer
 Terence Blanchard, jazz musician
 Kathleen Blanco, governor of Louisiana
 Douglas Brinkley, professor of history at Tulane University
 Karen Carter, New Orleans politician, member of the Louisiana State Legislature
 Louella Givens, representative, second district of Louisiana Board of Elementary and Secondary Education
 Cynthia Hedge-Morrell, member of the New Orleans City Council
 Donnell Herrington, survivor of a post-Katrina shooting in Algiers Point
 Mary Landrieu, senior U.S. Senator from Louisiana
 Mitch Landrieu, Lieutenant Governor of Louisiana
Dr. Calvin Mackie, faculty member of Tulane University and founder of Channel Zero; member of the Louisiana Recovery Authority
 Wynton Marsalis, musician
Dr. Hassan Mashriqui, researcher, Louisiana State University (LSU) Hurricane Center
 Marc Morial, former Mayor of New Orleans and President and CEO of the National Urban League
 Arthur Morrell, New Orleans politician and member of the Louisiana State Legislature
 Ray Nagin, mayor of New Orleans
 Soledad O'Brien, television journalist
 Sean Penn, actor and activist
 Wendell Pierce, New Orleans actor
 Garland Robinette, New Orleans journalist and radio host
 Junior Rodriguez, president of the St. Bernard Parish Council
Rev. Al Sharpton, civil rights activist
 Dinerral Shavers, musician
 Ivor van Heerden, deputy director of the Louisiana State University Hurricane Center
 Kanye West, music producer and rapper
 Phyllis Montana LeBlanc, resident of New Orleans East.

Music
The first installment opens with a photo and film montage of historic and recent New Orleans scenes, with a soundtrack of Louis Armstrong performing Louis Alter's "Do You Know What It Means to Miss New Orleans". At the end of the last episode is a similar montage with Fats Domino's "Walking to New Orleans" on the soundtrack.

The film's original score is by Terence Blanchard, a New Orleans-born trumpeter who appears in the film, with his mother and aunt, as they return to their flooded home. Not being the first time that Terence Blanchard had worked as a composer for a film by Spike Lee, Blanchard had worked to create compositions of a more universal genre of jazz as opposed to New Orleans style jazz in order to reach masses of audiences to raise awareness of the results of New Orleans after Hurricane Katrina. In general, the music he had composed was written under the context of respecting those who were directly affected by the catastrophe and with intentions of providing contexts to allow audiences to sympathize with those affected.

Awards
When the Levees Broke won three Emmy Awards:  Exceptional Merit in Nonfiction Filmmaking, Outstanding Directing for Nonfiction Programming, and Outstanding Picture Editing for Nonfiction Programming.

It received a 2006 Peabody Award from the University of Georgia for being an "epic document of destruction and broken promises and a profound work of art" and "an uncompromising analysis of the events that precede and follow Hurricane Katrina's assault on New Orleans" that "tells the story with an unparalleled diversity of voices and sources."

It won the 2007 NAACP Image Award for Outstanding Television Movie, Mini-Series or Dramatic Special. At the 63rd Venice International Film Festival the film was awarded the Horizons award in the documentary category. The film was also selected as part of the 2008 Whitney Biennial.

Points made by the film

The film focuses on the suffering of those affected by the disaster and their will to survive. Additionally, it suggests that the disaster in New Orleans was preventable, caused by levees poorly designed by the United States Army Corps of Engineers, and the suffering afterward was compounded by failures at all levels of government, most severely at the State level. These points are in line with mainstream investigations, including the bipartisan U.S. Congressional report, A Failure of Initiative, and the Army Corps of Engineers' own studies.

See also
 2005 levee failures in Greater New Orleans
 Criticism of the government response to Hurricane Katrina

References

External links
 , Official website, HBO
 
 

Films directed by Spike Lee
Documentary films about Hurricane Katrina
40 Acres and a Mule Filmworks films
American documentary television films
2000s American television miniseries
2006 television films
2006 films
2006 documentary films
Films shot in New Orleans
HBO documentary films
History of New Orleans
Peabody Award-winning broadcasts
Films set in Louisiana
Films scored by Terence Blanchard
Primetime Emmy Award-winning broadcasts
2000s English-language films
2000s American films
English-language documentary films